Wasserauen railway station is a railway station in the district of Schwende-Rüte, in the Swiss canton of Appenzell Innerrhoden. It is located on the  Gossau–Wasserauen line of Appenzell Railways.

Services 
 the following services stop at Wasserauen:

References

External links 
 
 

Railway stations in the canton of Appenzell Innerrhoden
Appenzell Railways stations